Agrilus politus, known generally as the willow gall limb borer or common willow agrilus, is a species of metallic wood-boring beetle in the family Buprestidae. It is found in Central America and North America.

References

Further reading

 
 
 

politus
Beetles of Central America
Beetles of North America
Taxa named by Thomas Say
Beetles described in 1825
Articles created by Qbugbot